This article details the fixtures and results of the Macau national football team.

Results and fixtures

2009

2010

2011

2012

2013

2014

2015

2016

2017

2018

2019

References

results
2009 in Macau football
2010 in Macau football
2011 in Macau football
2012 in Macau football
2013 in Macau football
2014 in Macau football
2015 in Macau football